Ho Chi Minh City Television (HTV) is a Vietnamese television network owned by the People's Committee of Ho Chi Minh City.

History 

The old name of HCMC Television was Saigon Liberation Television that began broadcasting on 1 May 1975. Until April 30, 1975, the name was Saigon Television (Republic of Vietnam), founded in 1965, broadcast from February 2, 1966, to April 29, 1975. At the time, in Saigon, there were two different TV stations immediately adjacent in downtown: the TV station of the US military and Saigon Television. While in South Vietnam there were five TV stations (Saigon, Cần Thơ, Huế, Nha Trang and Quy Nhơn), television in the North Vietnam was still in the testing period.

After the opening of the center building in early 2006 with modern equipment and technology, HTV gradually switched to digital operations along with its good staff. HTV aims to become one of the most powerful media companies in Southeast Asia.

Operations 
The station's main headquarters are located at the corner of Nguyen Thi Minh Khai and Dinh Tien Hoang Street. It also has an office in Ha Noi. HTV has two main analog channels - HTV7 and HTV9. The station started digital television at the end of 2013 using two to three multiplexes that transmit a total of 17 HTV-owned channels.

HTV7 and HTV9 also began broadcasting on the satellite in 2005, which covers the Southeast Asian countries and some other Asian countries. HTV has 17 channels:

Services 
HTV has:
 TFS, a TV studio, specializing in producing movies and documentary films.
 TV Service Center (TSC), a venue to contact the services and advertisements.
 Programme Production Centre (PPC), a production company, specialize in producing television programs.
 Ho Chi Minh City Television Cable Center (HTVC) brings quality programming to the audience in Vietnam and worldwide. The main programs include science, education, sports, movies, entertainment, etc.

HTV's cable system has various channels where HTV has rights to rebroadcast such as:

 National: Vietnam Television, An Viên Television, People's Police Television, Hanoi Radio Television, HTV3, Yan TV, among others.
 News: Cable News Network (CNN IAP), France 24, FOX News, BBC World, CNBC Asia, Channel NewsAsia, Bloomberg, NHK World TV.
 Documentary: Discovery Channel, TLC, Animal Planet, National Geographic, Nat Geo Wild, Nat Geo People, BBC Earth, Da Vinci Learning, Discovery Asia, Asian Food Channel.
 Sports: Fox Sports, Fox Sports 2, Fox Sports 3.
 Movies and series: HBO, Cinemax, Fox Movies, AXN, Cinema World.
 Kids: Cartoon Network, Boomerang, Animax, Disney Channel, Disney Junior, Baby TV, CBeebies.
 Music: Channel V, MTV Asia.
 General Entertainment and Worldwide Promotion: E!, Star World, Fashion TV, Arirang, KBS World, TV5 Monde, DW-TV, tvN, ABC Australia, Warner TV, NHK World Premium, Outdoor Channel, BBC Lifestyle.

Featured programs

Prizes, tournaments, contests 
 Miss Television Contest 1967: THVN9 organizes the first contest of Vietnam & Southeast Asia.
National bicycle race for Ho Chi Minh City Television Cup (since 1989): The first bicycle race of a television station in Vietnam  Organized by Vietnam, with the aim of promoting the movement of sports socialization and celebrating the day of national reunification.
Ho Chi Minh City Television Singing (Tiếng hát truyền hình) (1991–2015): The first singing competition on Vietnamese television was held once a year. The winning vocalists from this contest, especially in the first 15 years, all became famous singers after the competition. Typical faces from this contest include Nhu Quynh, Mai Thien Van, Dam Vinh Hung...
Giai điệu trái tim (2000-2001): New song composition contest, with the participation of many musicians of that time.
 Chuông vàng vọng cổ (since 2006): A contest to select new actors, contributing to the development of reformed art reform. 
HTV Award (until 2016): The annual award is given to artists, individuals, actors... who have contributed to HTV during a year 
Tiếng hát măng non truyền hình 
 Tiếng ca học đường 
Người dẫn chương trình truyền hình - Én vàng (Golden Swallow) (since 2004)
Thử thách địa hình - HTV Challenge Cup (from 2019)

Annual special program 
 Tao Quan (1982–2019): A comedy program that aired on the last night of the lunar year and ended at the time of New Year's Eve, with the main character being Tao Quan - who synthesizes the main events.  occurred during the year.  "Tao Quan" first premiered in Vietnam on HTV9 on New Year's Eve (January 24, 1982) and became the most anticipated program on New Year's Eve in the two decades.

Other 
 Nhịp cầu âm nhạc (1999–2016): The first live on-demand music program in Vietnam.  The program has a phone number with 6 lines to receive direct requests from the audience, broadcast once a month on channel HTV7. 
 Vầng trăng cổ nhạc (since 2001): Ancient song program & cai luong excerpt aired once a month. 
Trong nhà ngoài phố 
Ngân mãi chuông vàng
 Vượt lên chính mình (2005–2018).
 Chinh phục đỉnh Everest (2007–2008): Athletes had to conquer four peaks: Fansipan (VN), Kinabalu (Malaysia), Kilimanjaro (Africa), Island Peak (Nepal) before the challenge.  finally the "roof of the world" - peak Everest (in Nepal).  On May 22, 2008, the first 3 climbers of Vietnam, Bui Van Ngoi (25 years old), Phan Thanh Nhien (23 years old) and Nguyen Mau Linh (31 years old) entered the list of conquerors.  reach the summit of Mount Everest.
 Ngôi nhà mơ ước  (since 2005): The program to build houses for disadvantaged families across the country.
 Thay lời muốn nói (since 2000).
 Thử thách cùng bước nhảy (2012–2016): Dance competition program, based on the format So you think you can dance of the US, performed by HTV & East West Promotion.
 60 giây (since 2012): General news program, security and order, society, domestic & international culture... broadcast live in 2 time frames 06:30–07  :00 and 18:30-19:00 every day on HTV7 and HTV9, conducted by HTV News Center, Dien Quan & ADT Group Holdings.
 Tiếng hát mãi xanh
 Thần tượng âm nhạc - Vietnam Idol (Season 1 & 2)
 Người bí ẩn - Odd One In (since 2014): The program searches for talents, strange stories, extraordinary talents... hidden through the competition rounds with the judgment of the artists.  , in cooperation with the company  Dong Tay Promotion to implement.
Bí mật đêm chủ nhật
 Vì yêu mà đến
 Running Man Vietnam: A popular and successful campaigning reality TV show in some countries, in collaboration with Madison Media Group  (Season 1) and East West Promotion (Season 2) production.
 Nhanh như chớp
 Siêu trí tuệ Việt Nam: A program to search for talents and talents related to mind, judgment, and copyrights from China, implemented by HTV & Vie Channel of DatvietVAC.  
 Rap Việt - The Rapper
Rock Việt
Xuân Hạ Thu Đông, rồi lại Xuân
Cơ hội đổi đời
Tiếng rao 4.0
Hát mãi ước mơ
Sàn đấu vũ đạo
 Hát cho ngày mai: Music program to honor doctors and volunteers in the fight against COVID-19.
Mẹ vắng nhà, ba là siêu nhân - The Return Of Superman
 Đây chính là nhảy đường phố - Street Dance Vietnam
2 ngày 1 đêm - 2 Days and 1 Night

See also 
 Vietnam Television
 Television and mass media in Vietnam
 Vietnam Television (1966-75)
 List of television programmes broadcast by HTV

References

External links
 
 YouTube channels:
 HTV Entertainment
 HTV Sports
 HTV Education

Mass media in Ho Chi Minh City
Television companies of Vietnam
Television channels and stations established in 1966